Konstantinović is a Serbian surname, a patronymic derived from the masculine given name Konstantin (Constantine). It may refer to:

Radomir Konstantinović (1928−2011), Serbian writer and philosopher
Katarina Konstantinović (1848–1910), Serbian noblewoman
Natalija Konstantinović (1882−1950), Princess consort of Montenegro
Anka Konstantinović (1821–1868), Serbian noblewoman

See also
Kostadinović, similar surname

Serbian surnames
Patronymic surnames
Surnames from given names